Dronova is a rural locality (a selo) in Karachevsky District, Bryansk Oblast, Russia. The population was 300 as of 2010. There are 14 streets.

Geography 
Dronova is located 23 km southeast of Karachev (the district's administrative centre) by road. Karpovka is the nearest rural locality.

References 

Rural localities in Karachevsky District
Karachevsky Uyezd